Human migration is the movement of people from one place to another with intentions of settling, permanently or temporarily, at a new location (geographic region). The movement often occurs over long distances and from one country to another (external migration), but internal migration (within a single country) is also possible; indeed, this is the dominant form of human migration globally. Migration is often associated with better human capital at both individual and household level, and with better access to migration networks, facilitating a possible second move. It has a high potential to improve human development, and some studies confirm that migration is the most direct route out of poverty.Age is also important for both work and non-work migration. People may migrate as individuals, in family units or in large groups. There are four major forms of migration: invasion, conquest, colonization and emigration/immigration.

Persons moving from their home due to forced displacement (such as a natural disaster or civil disturbance) may be described as displaced persons or, if remaining in the home country, internally-displaced persons. A person who seeks refuge in another country can, if the reason for leaving the home country is political, religious, or another form of persecution, make a formal application to that country where refuge is sought and is then usually described as an asylum seeker. If this application is successful, this person's legal status becomes refugee.

In contemporary times, migration governance has become closely associated with state sovereignty. States retain the power of decide on the entry and stay of non-nationals because migration directly affects some of the defining elements of a state.

Definition 

Depending on the goal and reason for relocation, people who migrate can be divided into three categories: migrants, refugees, and asylum seekers. Each category is defined broadly as the mixed circumstances that motivate a person to change their location.

As such, migrants are traditionally described as persons who change the country of their residence for general reasons and purposes. These purposes may include the search for better job opportunities or healthcare needs. This term is the most generally defined one as anyone changing their geographic location permanently can be considered a migrant.

In contrast, refugees are not defined and described as persons who do not willingly relocate. The reasons for the refugees' migration usually involve war actions within the country or other forms of oppression, coming either from the government or non-governmental sources. Refugees are usually associated with people who must unwillingly relocate as fast as possible; hence, such migrants will likely relocate undocumented.

Asylum seekers are associated with persons who also leave their country unwillingly, yet, who also do not do so under oppressing circumstances such as war or death threats. The motivation to leave the country for asylum seekers might involve an unstable economic or political situation or high rates of crime. Thus, asylum seekers relocate predominantly to escape the degradation of the quality of their lives.

Nomadic movements usually are not regarded as migrations, as the movement is generally seasonal, there is no intention to settle in the new place, and only a few people have retained this form of lifestyle in modern times. Temporary movement for travel, tourism, pilgrimages, or the commute is also not regarded as migration, in the absence of an intention to live and settle in the visited places.

Migration patterns and related numbers 

There exist many statistical estimates of worldwide migration patterns.

The World Bank has published three editions of its Migration and Remittances Factbook, beginning in 2008, with a second edition appearing in 2011 and a third in 2016. The International Organisation for Migration (IOM) has published ten editions of the World Migration Report since 1999. The United Nations Statistics Division also keeps a database on worldwide migration. Recent advances in research on migration via the Internet promise better understanding of migration patterns and migration motives.

Structurally, there is substantial South–South and North–North migration; in 2013, 38% of all migrants had migrated from developing countries to other developing countries, while 23% had migrated from high-income OECD countries to other high-income countries. The United Nations Population Fund says that "while the North has experienced a higher absolute increase in the migrant stock since 2000 (32 million) compared to the South (25 million), the South recorded a higher growth rate. Between 2000 and 2013, the average annual rate of change of the migrant population in developing regions (2.3%) slightly exceeded that of the developed regions (2.1%)."

Substantial internal migration can also take place within a country, either seasonal human migration (mainly related to agriculture and tourism to urban places), or shifts of the population into cities (urbanisation) or out of cities (suburbanisation). However, studies of worldwide migration patterns tend to limit their scope to international migration.

Almost half of these migrants are women, one of the most significant migrant-pattern changes in the last half-century. Women migrate alone or with their family members and community. Even though female migration is largely viewed as an association rather than independent migration, emerging studies argue complex and manifold reasons for this.

As of 2019, the top ten immigration destinations were:

 United States
 Germany
 Saudi Arabia
 Russian Federation
 United Kingdom
 United Arab Emirates
 France
 Canada
 Australia
 Italy

In the same year, the top countries of origin were:

 India
 Mexico
 China
 Russian Federation
 Syrian Arab Republic
 Bangladesh
 Pakistan
 Philippines
 Afghanistan
 Indonesia

Besides these rankings, according to absolute numbers of migrants, the Migration and Remittances Factbook also gives statistics for top immigration destination countries and top emigration origin countries according to percentage of the population; the countries that appear at the top of those rankings are entirely different than the ones in the above rankings and tend to be much smaller countries.

As of 2013, the top 15 migration corridors (accounting for at least 2 million migrants each) were:

 Mexico–United States
 Russian Federation–Ukraine
 Bangladesh–India
 Ukraine–Russian Federation
 Kazakhstan–Russian Federation
 China–United States
 Russian Federation–Kazakhstan
 Afghanistan–Pakistan
 Afghanistan–Iran
 China–Hong Kong
 India–United Arab Emirates
 West Bank and Gaza–Jordan
 India–United States
 India–Saudi Arabia
 Philippines–United States

Economic impacts

World economy 

The impacts of human migration on the world economy have been largely positive. In 2015, migrants, who constituted 3.3% of the world population, contributed 9.4% of global GDP.

At a microeconomic level, the value of a human mobility is largely recognized by firms. A 2021 survey by the Boston Consulting Group found that 72% of 850+ executives across several countries and industries believed that migration benefited their countries, and 45% considered globally diverse employees a strategic advantage.

According to the Centre for Global Development, opening all borders could add $78 trillion to the world GDP.

Remittances 
Remittances (funds transferred by migrant workers to their home country) form a substantial part of the economy of some countries. The top ten remittance recipients in 2018.

In addition to economic impacts, migrants also make substantial contributions in sociocultural and civic-political life. Sociocultural contributions occur in the following areas of societies: food/cuisine, sport, music, art/culture, ideas and beliefs; civic-political contributions relate to participation in civic duties in the context of accepted authority of the State. It is in recognition of the importance of these remittances that the United Nations Sustainable Development Goal 10 targets to substantially reduce the transaction costs of migrants remittances to less than 3% by 2030.

Voluntary and forced migration 
Migration is usually divided into voluntary migration and forced migration.

The distinction between involuntary (fleeing political conflict or natural disaster) and voluntary migration (economic or labour migration) is difficult to make and partially subjective, as the motivators for migration are often correlated. The World Bank estimated that, as of 2010, 16.3 million or 7.6% of migrants qualified as refugees. This number grew to 19.5 million by 2014 (comprising approximately 7.9% of the total number of migrants, based on the figure recorded in 2013). At levels of roughly 3 percent the share of migrants among the world population has remained remarkably constant over the last 5 decades.

Voluntary migration 
Voluntary migration is based on the initiative and the free will of the person and is influenced by a combination of factors: economic, political and social: either in the migrants` country of origin (determinant factors or "push factors") or in the country of destination (attraction factors or "pull factors").

"Push-pull factors" are the reasons that push or attract people to a particular place. "Push" factors are the negative aspects(for example wars) of the country of origin, often decisive in people's choice to emigrate. The "pull" factors are the positive aspects of a different country that encourages people to emigrate to seek a better life. For example, the government of Armenia periodically gives incentives to people who will migrate to live in villages close to the border with Azerbaijan. This is an implementation of a push strategy, and the reason people do not want to live near the border is security concerns given tensions and hostility because of Azerbaijan.

Although the push-pull factors are opposed, both are sides of the same coin, being equally important. Although specific to forced migration, any other harmful factor can be considered a "push factor" or determinant/trigger factor, such examples being: poor quality of life, lack of jobs, excessive pollution, hunger, drought or natural disasters. Such conditions represent decisive reasons for voluntary migration, the population preferring to migrate in order to prevent financially unfavorable situations or even emotional and physical suffering.

Forced migration 
There exist contested definitions of forced migration. However, the editors of a leading scientific journal on the subject, the Forced Migration Review, offer the following definition: Forced migration refers to the movements of refugees and internally displaced people (displaced by conflict) as well as people displaced by natural or environmental disasters, chemical or nuclear disasters, famine, or development projects. These different causes of migration leave people with one choice, to move to a new environment. Immigrants leave their beloved homes to seek a life in camps, spontaneous settlement, and countries of asylum.

By the end of 2018, there were an estimated 67.2 million forced migrants globally25.9 million refugees displaced from their countries, and 41.3 million internally displaced persons that had been displaced within their countries for different reasons.

Contemporary labor migration theories

Overview 
Numerous causes impel migrants to move to another country. For instance, globalization has increased the demand for workers in order to sustain national economies. Thus one category of economic migrants – generally from impoverished developing countries – migrates to obtain sufficient income for survival.

Such migrants often send some of their income homes to family members in the form of economic remittances, which have become an economic staple in a number of developing countries. People may also move or are forced to move as a result of conflict, of human-rights violations, of violence, or to escape persecution. In 2013 it was estimated that around 51.2 million people fell into this category. Other reasons people may move include to gain access to opportunities and services or to escape extreme weather. This type of movement, usually from rural to urban areas, may be classed as internal migration. Sociology-cultural and ego-historical factors also play a major role. In North Africa, for example, emigrating to Europe counts as a sign of social prestige. Moreover, many countries were former colonies. This means that many have relatives who live legally in the (former) colonial metro pole and who often provide important help for immigrants arriving in that metropole.

Relatives may help with job research and with accommodation. The geographical proximity of Africa to Europe and the long historical ties between Northern and Southern Mediterranean countries also prompt many to migrate.

Whether a person decides to move to another country depends on the relative skill premier of the source and host countries. One is speaking of positive selection when the host country shows a higher skill premium than the source country. On the other hand, negative selection occurs when the source country displays a lower skill premium. The relative skill premia define migrants selectivity. Age heaping techniques display one method to measure the relative skill premium of a country.

A number of theories attempt to explain the international flow of capital and people from one country to another.

Research contributions 
Recent academic output on migration comprises mainly journal articles. The long-term trend shows a gradual increase in academic publishing on migration, which is likely to be related to the general expansion of academic literature production, and the increased prominence of migration research.
Migration and its research have further changed with the revolution in information and communication technologies.

Neoclassical economic theory 

This migration theory states that the main reason for labour migration is wage difference between two geographic locations. These wage differences are usually linked to geographic labour demand and supply. It can be said that areas with a shortage of labour but an excess of capital have a high relative wage while areas with a high labour supply and a dearth of capital have a low relative wage. Labour tends to flow from low-wage areas to high-wage areas. Often, with this flow of labour comes changes in the sending and the receiving country. Neoclassical economic theory best describes transnational migration because it is not confined by international immigration laws and similar governmental regulations.

Dual labor market theory 
Dual labour market theory states that pull factors in more developed countries mainly cause migration. This theory assumes that the labour markets in these developed countries consist of two segments: the primary market, which requires high-skilled labour, and the secondary market, which is very labour-intensive, requiring low-skilled workers. This theory assumes that migration from less developed countries into more developed countries results from a pull created by a need for labour in the developed countries in their secondary market. Migrant workers are needed to fill the lowest rung of the labour market because the native labourers do not want to do these jobs as they present a lack of mobility. This creates a need for migrant workers. Furthermore, the initial dearth in available labour pushes wages up, making migration even more enticing.

New economics of labor migration 
This theory states that migration flows and patterns cannot be explained solely at the level of individual workers and their economic incentives but that wider social entities must also be considered. One such social entity is the household. Migration can be viewed as a result of risk aversion from a household that has insufficient income. In this case, the household needs extra capital that can be achieved through remittances sent back by family members who participate in migrant labour abroad. These remittances can also have a broader effect on the economy of the sending country as a whole as they bring in capital. Recent research has examined a decline in US interstate migration from 1991 to 2011, theorising that the reduced interstate migration is due to a decline in the geographic specificity of occupations and an increase in workers' ability to learn about other locations before moving there, through both information technology and inexpensive travel. Other researchers find that the location-specific nature of housing is more important than moving costs in determining labour reallocation.

Relative deprivation theory 

Relative deprivation theory states that awareness of the income difference between neighbours or other households in the migrant-sending community is essential in migration. The incentive to migrate is a lot higher in areas with a high level of economic inequality. In the short run, remittances may increase inequality, but in the long run, they may decrease it. There are two stages of migration for workers: first, they invest in human capital formation, and then they try to capitalise on their investments. In this way, successful migrants may use their new capital to provide better schooling for their children and better homes for their families. Successful high-skilled emigrants may serve as an example for neighbours and potential migrants who hope to achieve that level of success.

World systems theory 
World-systems theory looks at migration from a global perspective. It explains that interaction between different societies can be an important factor in social change. Trade with one country, which causes an economic decline in another, may create incentive to migrate to a country with a more vibrant economy. It can be argued that even after decolonisation, the economic dependence of former colonies remains on mother countries. However, this view of international trade is controversial, and some argue that free trade can reduce migration between developing and developed countries. It can be argued that the developed countries import labour-intensive goods, which causes an increase in the employment of unskilled workers in the less developed countries, decreasing the outflow of migrant workers. Exporting capital-intensive goods from rich countries to developing countries also equalises income and employment conditions, thus slowing migration. In either direction, this theory can be used to explain migration between countries that are geographically far apart.

Osmosis theory 
Based on the history of human migration osmosis theory studies the evolution of its natural determinants. In this theory migration is divided into two main types: simple and complicated. The simple migration is divided, in its turn, into diffusion, stabilisation and concentration periods. During these periods, water availability, adequate climate, security and population density represent the natural determinants of human migration. The complicated migration is characterised by the speedy evolution and the emergence of new sub-determinants, notably earning, unemployment, networks, and migration policies. Osmosis theory explains analogically human migration by the biophysical phenomenon of osmosis. In this respect, the countries are represented by animal cells, the borders by the semipermeable membranes and the humans by ions of water. According to the theory, according to the osmosis phenomenon, humans migrate from countries with less migration pressure to countries with high migration pressure. To measure the latter, the natural determinants of human migration replace the variables of the second principle of thermodynamics used to measure the osmotic pressure.

Social-scientific theories

Sociology 
A number of social scientists have examined immigration from a sociological perspective, paying particular attention to how immigration affects and is affected by, matters of race and ethnicity, as well as social structure. They have produced three main sociological perspectives:
 symbolic interactionism, which aims to understand migration via face-to-face interactions on a micro-level
 social conflict theory, which examines migration through the prism of competition for power and resources
 structural functionalism (based on the ideas of Émile Durkheim), which examines the role of migration in fulfilling certain functions within each society, such as the decrease of despair and aimlessness and the consolidation of social networks

More recently, as attention has shifted away from countries of destination, sociologists have attempted to understand how transnationalism allows us to understand the interplay between migrants, their countries of destination, and their countries of origins. In this framework, work on social remittances by Peggy Levitt and others has led to a stronger conceptualisation of how migrants affect socio-political processes in their countries of origin.

Much work also takes place in the field of integration of migrants into destination-societies.

Political science
Political scientists have put forth a number of theoretical frameworks relating to migration, offering different perspectives on processes of security, citizenship, and international relations. The political importance of diasporas has also become a growing field of interest, as scholars examine questions of diaspora activism, state-diaspora relations, out-of-country voting processes, and states' soft power strategies. In this field, the majority of work has focused on immigration politics, viewing migration from the perspective of the country of destination. With regard to emigration processes, political scientists have expanded on Albert Hirschman's framework on '"voice" vs. "exit" to discuss how emigration affects the politics within countries of origin.

Historical theories

Ravenstein 

Certain laws of social science have been proposed to describe human migration. The following was a standard list after Ernst Georg Ravenstein's proposal in the 1880s:

 every migration flow generates a return or counter migration.
 the majority of migrants move a short distance.
 migrants who move longer distances tend to choose big-city destinations.
 urban residents are often less migratory than inhabitants of rural areas.
 families are less likely to make international moves than young adults.
 most migrants are adults.
 large towns grow by migration rather than natural increase.
 migration stage by stage (step migration).
 urban, rural difference.
 migration and technology.
 economic condition.

Lee 
Lee's laws divide factors causing migrations into two groups of factors: push and pull factors. Push factors are things that are unfavourable about the area that one lives in, and pull factors are things that attract one to another area.

Push factors:

 Not enough jobs
 Few opportunities
 Inadequate conditions
 Desertification
 Famine or drought
 Political fear of persecution
 Slavery or forced labour
 Poor medical care
 Loss of wealth
 Natural disasters
 Death threats
 Desire for more political or religious freedom
 Pollution
 Poor housing
 Landlord/tenant issues
 Bullying
 Mentality
 Discrimination
 Poor chances of marrying
 Condemned housing (radon gas, etc.)
 War
 Radiation
 Disease

Pull factors:

 Job opportunities
 Better living conditions
 The feeling of having more political or religious freedom
 Enjoyment
 Education
 Better medical care
 Attractive climates
 Security
 Family links
 Industry
 Better chances of marrying

Climate cycles 
The modern field of climate history suggests that the successive waves of Eurasian nomadic movement throughout history have had their origins in climatic cycles, which have expanded or contracted pastureland in Central Asia, especially Mongolia and to its west the Altai. People were displaced from their home ground by other tribes trying to find land that essential flocks could graze, each group pushing the next further to the south and west, into the highlands of Anatolia, the Pannonian Plain, into Mesopotamia, or southwards, into the rich pastures of China. Bogumil Terminski uses the term "migratory domino effect" to describe this process in the context of Sea People invasion.

Food, sex, security 
The theory is that migration occurs because individuals search for food, sex and security outside their usual habitation; Idyorough (2008) believes that towns and cities are a creation of the human struggle to obtain food, sex and security. To produce food, security and reproduction, human beings must, out of necessity, move out of their usual habitation and enter into indispensable social relationships that are cooperative or antagonistic. Human beings also develop the tools and equipment to interact with nature to produce the desired food and security. The improved relationship (cooperative relationships) among human beings and improved technology further conditioned by the push and pull factors all interact together to cause or bring about migration and higher concentration of individuals into towns and cities. The higher the technology of production of food and security and the higher the cooperative relationship among human beings in the production of food and security and the reproduction of the human species, the higher would be the push and pull factors in the migration and concentration of human beings in towns and cities. Countryside, towns and cities do not just exist, but they do so to meet the basic human needs of food, security and the reproduction of the human species. Therefore, migration occurs because individuals search for food, sex and security outside their usual habitation. Social services in the towns and cities are provided to meet these basic needs for human survival and pleasure.

Other models 
 Zipf's inverse distance law (1956)
 Gravity model of migration and the friction of distance
 Radiation law for human mobility
 Buffer theory
 Stouffer's theory of intervening opportunities (1940)
 Zelinsky's Mobility Transition Model (1971)
 Bauder's regulation of labour markets (2006): "suggests that the international migration of workers is necessary for the survival of industrialised economies...[It] turns the conventional view of international migration on its head: it investigates how migration regulates labour markets, rather than labour markets shaping migration flows."

Migration governance 
By their very nature, international migration and displacement are transnational issues concerning the origin and destination States and States through which migrants may travel (often referred to as "transit" States) or in which they are hosted following displacement across national borders. And yet, somewhat paradoxically, the majority of migration governance has historically remained with individual states. Their policies and regulations on migration are typically made at the national level. For the most part, migration governance has been closely associated with State sovereignty. States retain the power of deciding on the entry and stay of non-nationals because migration directly affects some of the defining elements of a State. Comparative surveys reveal varying degrees of openness to migrants across countries, considering policies such as visa availability, employment prerequisites, and paths to residency.

Bilateral and multilateral arrangements are features of migration governance at an international level. There are several global arrangements in the form of international treaties in which States have reached an agreement on the application of human rights and the related responsibilities of States in specific areas. The 1966 International Covenant on Civil and Political Rights and the 1951 Convention Relating to the Status of Refugees (Refugee Convention) are two significant examples notable for being widely ratified. Other migration conventions have not been so broadly accepted, such as the International Convention on the Protection of the Rights of All Migrant Workers and Members of Their Families, which still has no traditional countries of destination among its States parties. Beyond this, there have been numerous multilateral and global initiatives, dialogues and processes on migration over several decades. The Global Compact for Safe, Orderly and Regular Migration (Global Compact for Migration) is another milestone, as the first internationally negotiated statement of objectives for migration governance striking a balance between migrants' rights and the principle of States' sovereignty over their territory. Although it is not legally binding, the Global Compact for Migration was adopted by consensus in December 2018 at a United Nations conference in which more than 150 United Nations Member States participated and, later that same month, in the United Nations General Assembly (UNGA), by a vote among the Member States of 152 to 5 (with 12 abstentions).

See also 

 Colonization
 Demographics of the world
 Early human migrations
 El Inmigrante – 2005 film
 Environmental migrant
 Existential migration
 Expatriate
 Feminisation of migration
 Genographic Project
 Humanitarian crisis
 Illegal immigration
 Linguistic Diversity in Space and Time
 Immigration to Europe
 List of diasporas
 Jewish diaspora
 Migrant literature
 Migration in China
 Most recent common ancestor
 Offshoring
 Political demography
 Queer migration
 Refugee roulette
 Religion and human migration
 Replacement migration
 Separation barrier
 Settler colonialism
 Snowbird (person)
 Space colonization
 Timeline of maritime migration and exploration

References

Sources

Books 
 Anderson, Vivienne. and Johnson, Henry. (eds) Migration, Education and Translation: Cross-Disciplinary Perspectives on Human Mobility and Cultural Encounters in Education Settings. New York: Routledge, 2020.
 Behdad, Ali. A Forgetful Nation: On Immigration and Cultural Density in the United States, Duke UP, 2005. 
 Chaichian, Mohammad. Empires and Walls: Globalisation, Migration, and Colonial Control, Leiden: Brill, 2014. 
 Jared Diamond, Guns, germs and steel. A short history of everybody for the last 13'000 years, 1997. 
 De La Torre, Miguel A., Trails of Terror: Testimonies on the Current Immigration Debate, Orbis Books, 2009. 
 Fell, Peter and Hayes, Debra. What are they doing here? A critical guide to asylum and immigration, Birmingham (UK): Venture Press, 2007. 
 Hanlon, Bernadette and Vicino, Thomas J. Global Migration: The Basics, New York and London: Routledge, 2014. 
 Hoerder, Dirk. Cultures in Contact. World Migrations in the Second Millennium, Duke University Press, 2002. 
 Idyorough, Alamveabee E. "Sociological Analysis of Social Change in Contemporary Africa", Makurdi: Aboki Publishers, 2015.
 IOM World Migration Report, see World Migration Report International Organization for Migration
 Kleiner-Liebau, Désirée. Migration and the Construction of National Identity in Spain, Madrid / Frankfurt, Iberoamericana / Vervuert, Ediciones de Iberoamericana, 2009. .
 Knörr, Jacqueline. Women and Migration. Anthropological Perspectives, Frankfurt & New York: Campus Verlag & St. Martin's Press, 2000. 
 Knörr, Jacqueline. Childhood and Migration. From Experience to Agency, Bielefeld: Transcript, 2005.
 Manning, Patrick. Migration in World History, New York and London: Routledge, 2005. 
 Miller, Mark & Castles, Stephen (1993). The Age of Migration: International Population Movements in the Modern World. Guilford Press. 
 Migration for Employment, Paris: OECD Publications, 2004. 
 OECD International Migration Outlook 2007, Paris: OECD Publications, 2007.
 Pécoud, Antoine and Paul de Guchteneire (Eds): Migration without Borders, Essays on the Free Movements of People  (Berghahn Books, 2007). 
 Purohit, A. K. (ed.) The Philosophy of Evolution, Yash Publishing House, Bikaner, 2010. .
 Abdelmalek Sayad. The Suffering of the Immigrant, Preface by Pierre Bourdieu, Polity Press, 2004. 
 
 
 Stalker, Peter. No-Nonsense Guide to International Migration, New Internationalist, 2nd ed., 2008. 
 White, Micheal (Ed.) (2016). International Handbook of Migration and Population Distribution. Springer.

Journals 
 International Migration Review
 Migration Letters
 International Migration 
 Journal of Ethnic and Migration Studies
 Review of Economics of the Household

External links

 1911 Encyclopædia Britannica article* International Organization for Migration's World Migration Report 2020
 OECD International Migration Outlook 2007 (subscription service)
 Migration Policy Centre
 iom.int International Organisation for Migration
 CIA World Factbook, up-to-date statistics on net immigration by country
 Stalker's Guide to International Migration, a comprehensive interactive guide to modern migration issues, with maps and statistics
 Integration: Building Inclusive Societies (IBIS), a UN Alliance of Civilisations online community on good practices of integration of migrants across the world
 The importance of migrants in the modern world
 Mass migration as a travel business
 Return migration between 1850 and 1950 by Dr. Sarah Oberbichler Newseye projet (https://newseye.eu)
 Story of migration

 
Anthropology
Demographic economics
Demography
Genetic genealogy